Bobby Burton Howell is an American Republican member of the Mississippi House of Representatives from Kilmichael, Mississippi. Howell is a pharmacist, and former mayor of Kilmichael. He is also an alumnus of Delta State University and the University of Mississippi

References

Living people
Republican Party members of the Mississippi House of Representatives
1941 births
People from Winona, Mississippi
People from Kilmichael, Mississippi